Marcos Antonio Román Solís (born 4 October 1988) is a Nicaraguan professional footballer who plays as a midfielder for Diriangén.

Club career
He has played his entire career for Diriangén, except for one season at Managua whom he left after a major clear-out in summer 2013.

International career
Román made his debut for Nicaragua in a May 2011 friendly match against Cuba and has, as of December 2013, earned a total of 3 caps, scoring no goals.

References

External links
 

1988 births
Living people
Association football midfielders
Nicaraguan men's footballers
Nicaragua international footballers
Diriangén FC players
Managua F.C. players